Conasprella pfluegeri is a species of sea snail, a marine gastropod mollusk in the family Conidae, the cone snails and their allies.

Like all species within the genus Conasprella, these cone snails are predatory and venomous. They are capable of "stinging" humans, therefore live ones should be handled carefully or not at all.

Description
The size of the shell varies between 15 mm and 25 mm.

Distribution
This marine species occurs off Southeast Florida.

References

 Petuch E. (2003) Cenozoic Seas : The view from eastern North America. xvi + 308 pp.
  Puillandre N., Duda T.F., Meyer C., Olivera B.M. & Bouchet P. (2015). One, four or 100 genera? A new classification of the cone snails. Journal of Molluscan Studies. 81: 1–23

External links
 Cone Shells – Knights of the Sea
 Gastropods.com: Jaspidiconus jaspideus pfluegeri (f)

Gallery

fluegeri
Gastropods described in 2003